Kipkelion Constituency was an electoral constituency in Kenya (1988-2012).It was a successor of the defunct Kericho East Constituency(1963-1988). It was one of the three constituencies of Kericho District. The constituency was established for the 1988 elections. It was later divided into Kipkelion East Constituency and Kipkelion West Constituency, both part of Kericho County.

Members of Parliament

Locations and wards

References 

Kericho County
Constituencies in Rift Valley Province
1988 establishments in Kenya
Constituencies established in 1988
Former constituencies of Kenya